Simon Aronson (1943–December 10, 2019) was an American magician and lawyer. He is noted for the Aronson stack and the trick Shuffle-Bored. He was the son of Arnold Aronson, the brother of Bernard W. Aronson, and first cousin of Si Kahn.

Two of his tricks were featured on Penn & Teller: Fool Us, both performed by other magicians: Prior Commitment, performed by Graham Jolley (which fooled Penn and Teller); and Shuffle-Bored, performed by Christopher Tracy and Jim Leach (which did not; Penn noted he was already well-acquainted with the trick).

Publications 
 The Card Ideas of Simon Aronson (1978)
 A Stack to Remember (1979)
 Shuffle-Bored (1980)
 Sessions (1982, with David Solomon)
 The Aronson Approach (1990)
 Bound to Please (1994, compilation)
 Simply Simon (1995)
 Memories are Made of This (1999)
 Try the Impossible (2001)
 Art Decko (2014)

References

External links 
Official website

1943 births
2019 deaths
American magicians